Gonzalo Adrián Urquijo (born 28 October 1989) is an Argentine professional footballer who plays as a centre-forward for Guillermo Brown.

Career
Urquijo began in the youth ranks of Atlético Carlos Casares, prior to featuring for the club at senior level. He remained with Atlético Carlos Casares, either side of a spell with Independiente, until 2012 when the forward agreed to join Agropecuario in Torneo Argentino B. Twenty-three goals across eighty-five matches followed in four years, with Agropecuario subsequently winning consecutive promotions up to Primera B Nacional. In his second professional appearance, on 7 October 2017, Urquijo scored and was sent off as they lost 3–1 to Brown; in a season in which he scored five goals in twenty-three games.

In January 2020, Urquijo was loaned to fellow second tier team Guillermo Brown. He scored in his first and second match for the club, netting at home against Deportivo Morón and away versus Temperley.

In January 2022, Urquijo signed for Italian Serie D side Bisceglie. He played 9 games for the Italian side, before returning to his homeland and signed with his former club, Guillermo Brown, in June 2022.

Career statistics
.

Honours
Agropecuario
 Torneo Federal A: 2016–17

References

External links

1989 births
Living people
Argentine footballers
Argentine expatriate footballers
Sportspeople from Buenos Aires Province
Association football forwards
Torneo Argentino B players
Torneo Federal A players
Primera Nacional players
Serie D players
Club Agropecuario Argentino players
Guillermo Brown footballers
A.S. Bisceglie Calcio 1913 players
Argentine expatriate sportspeople in Italy
Expatriate footballers in Italy